Matondo is a surname. Notable people with the surname include:

Rabbi Matondo (born 2000), Welsh footballer
Rosalie Matondo (born 1963), Republic of the Congo agronomist
Sita-Taty Matondo (born 1984), Canadian soccer player

See also
Jeanvion Yulu-Matondo (born 1986), Belgian footballer
Surnames of Congolese origin